Private practice may refer to:
Private sector practice
Practice of law
Private Practice (TV series), an American medical drama
Private Practice (album), released in 1978 by Dr. Feelgood

pt:Private Practice